Trusted Computer System Evaluation Criteria (TCSEC) is a United States Government Department of Defense (DoD) standard that sets basic requirements for assessing the effectiveness of computer security controls built into a computer system. The TCSEC was used to evaluate, classify, and select computer systems being considered for the processing, storage, and retrieval of sensitive or classified information.

The TCSEC, frequently referred to as the Orange Book, is the centerpiece of the DoD Rainbow Series publications. Initially issued in 1983 by the National Computer Security Center (NCSC), an arm of the National Security Agency, and then updated in 1985, TCSEC was eventually replaced by the Common Criteria international standard, originally published in 2005.

History 
Work on the Orange book began in 1979. In May 1982, an early version of the Orange Book known as the Blue Book was released to the public. In August 1983, the Orange Book was published.

In 1999, the Orange book was replaced by the International Common Criteria for Information Technology Security Evaluation.

On 24 October 2002, The Orange Book (aka DoDD 5200.28-STD) was canceled by DoDD 8500.1, which was later reissued as DoDI 8500.02, on 14 March 2014.

Fundamental objectives and requirements

Policy
The security policy must be explicit, well-defined, and enforced by the computer system. Three basic security policies are specified:
 Mandatory Security Policy – Enforces access control rules based directly on an individual's clearance, authorization for the information and the confidentiality level of the information being sought. Other indirect factors are physical and environmental. This policy must also accurately reflect the laws, general policies and other relevant guidance from which the rules are derived.
 Marking – Systems designed to enforce a mandatory security policy must store and preserve the integrity of access control labels and retain the labels if the object is exported.
 Discretionary Security Policy – Enforces a consistent set of rules for controlling and limiting access based on identified individuals who have been determined to have a need-to-know for the information.

Accountability
Individual accountability regardless of policy must be enforced. A secure means must exist to ensure the access of an authorized and competent agent that can then evaluate the accountability information within a reasonable amount of time and without undue difficulty. The accountability objective includes three requirements:
 Identification – The process used to recognize an individual user.
 Authentication – The verification of an individual user's authorization to specific categories of information.
 Auditing – Audit information must be selectively kept and protected so that actions affecting security can be traced to the authenticated individual.

Assurance
The computer system must contain hardware/software mechanisms that can be independently evaluated to provide sufficient assurance that the system enforces the above requirements. By extension, assurance must include a guarantee that the trusted portion of the system works only as intended. To accomplish these objectives, two types of assurance are needed with their respective elements:
 Assurance Mechanisms
 Operational Assurance: System Architecture, System Integrity, Covert Channel Analysis, Trusted Facility Management, and Trusted Recovery
 Life-cycle Assurance : Security Testing, Design Specification and Verification, Configuration Management, and Trusted System Distribution
 Continuous Protection Assurance – The trusted mechanisms that enforce these basic requirements must be continuously protected against tampering or unauthorized changes.

Documentation
Within each class, an additional set of documentation addresses the development, deployment, and management of the system rather than its capabilities. This documentation includes:
 Security Features User's Guide, Trusted Facility Manual, Test Documentation, and Design Documentation

Divisions and classes 
The TCSEC defines four divisions: D, C, B, and A, where division A has the highest security. Each division represents a significant difference in the trust an individual or organization can place on the evaluated system. Additionally divisions C, B and A are broken into a series of hierarchical subdivisions called classes: C1, C2, B1, B2, B3, and A1.

Each division and class expands or modifies as indicated the requirements of the immediately prior division or class.

D – Minimal protection
 Reserved for those systems that have been evaluated but that fail to meet the requirement for a higher division.

C – Discretionary protection
 C1 – Discretionary Security Protection
 Identification and authentication
 Separation of users and data
 Discretionary Access Control (DAC) capable of enforcing access limitations on an individual basis
 Required System Documentation and user manuals
 C2 – Controlled Access Protection
 More finely grained DAC
 Individual accountability through login procedures
 Audit trails
 Object reuse
 Resource isolation
 An example of such as system is HP-UX

B – Mandatory protection
 B1 – Labeled Security Protection
 Informal statement of the security policy model
 Data sensitivity labels
 Mandatory Access Control (MAC) over selected subjects and objects
 Label exportation capabilities
 Some discovered flaws must be removed or otherwise mitigated
 Design specifications and verification
 B2 – Structured Protection
 Security policy model clearly defined and formally documented
 DAC and MAC enforcement extended to all subjects and objects
 Covert storage channels are analyzed for occurrence and bandwidth
 Carefully structured into protection-critical and non-protection-critical elements
 Design and implementation enable more comprehensive testing and review
 Authentication mechanisms are strengthened
 Trusted facility management is provided with administrator and operator segregation
 Strict configuration management controls are imposed
 Operator and Administrator roles are separated.
 An example of such a system was Multics
 B3 – Security Domains
 Satisfies reference monitor requirements
 Structured to exclude code not essential to security policy enforcement
 Significant system engineering directed toward minimizing complexity
 Security administrator role defined
 Audit security-relevant events
 Automated imminent intrusion detection, notification, and response
 Trusted path to the TCB for the user authentication function
 Trusted system recovery procedures
 Covert timing channels are analyzed for occurrence and bandwidth
 An example of such a system is the XTS-300, a precursor to the XTS-400

A – Verified protection
 A1 – Verified Design
 Functionally identical to B3
 Formal design and verification techniques including a formal top-level specification
 Formal management and distribution procedures
 Examples of A1-class systems are Honeywell's SCOMP, Aesec's GEMSOS, and Boeing's SNS Server. Two that were unevaluated were the production LOCK platform and the cancelled DEC VAX Security Kernel.
 Beyond A1
 System Architecture demonstrates that the requirements of self-protection and completeness for reference monitors have been implemented in the Trusted Computing Base (TCB).
 Security Testing automatically generates test-case from the formal top-level specification or formal lower-level specifications.
 Formal Specification and Verification is where the TCB is verified down to the source code level, using formal verification methods where feasible.
 Trusted Design Environment is where the TCB is designed in a trusted facility with only trusted (cleared) personnel.

Matching classes to environmental requirements 
The publication entitled "Army Regulation 380-19" is an example of a guide to determining which system class should be used in a given situation.

See also 
 AR 380-19 superseded by AR 25-2
 Canadian Trusted Computer Product Evaluation Criteria
 Common Criteria
 ITSEC
 Rainbow Series
 Trusted Platform Module

References

External links
 National Security Institute - 5200.28-STD Trusted Computer System Evaluation Criteria
 FAS IRP DOD Trusted Computer System Evaluation Criteria DOD 5200.28 

National Security Agency
Computer security standards
Trusted computing